José Monroy (born 4 May 1980) is a Portuguese racing driver currently competing in the TCR International Series. He previously competed in the SEAT León Eurocup and European Touring Car Cup.

Racing career
Monroy began his career in 2007 in the Portuguese Touring Car Championship, he won the championship in 2008. He switched to the European Touring Car Cup in 2009, he ended 8th in the standings. In 2014 Monroy switched to the SEAT León Eurocup. In May 2015, it was announced that Monroy would make his TCR International Series debut with Veloso Motorsport driving a SEAT León Cup Racer.

Racing record

Complete TCR International Series results
(key) (Races in bold indicate pole position) (Races in italics indicate fastest lap)

References

External links
 
 

1980 births
Living people
Portuguese racing drivers
European Touring Car Cup drivers
SEAT León Eurocup drivers
TCR International Series drivers
Sportspeople from Lisbon
24H Series drivers